HMS Ballinderry was a  of the Royal Navy which served during the Second World War.

Ballinderry was ordered 20 June 1941 as part of the River-class building programme. The vessel was laid down on 6 November 1941 by Blyth Shipbuilding & Drydock Co. Ltd at Blyth and launched 7 December 1942.

War service
After commissioning and trials, Ballinderry conducted work up exercises at Tobermory before commencing operations as a convoy escort.

Postwar service
Ballinderry was reduced to reserve at Harwich in 1947. The ship was refitted at Liverpool in 1951, before returning to reserve at Harwich, where she remained until 1954. In 1955, Ballinderry, still in reserve, moved to Barry in Wales. On 7 July 1961 the frigate was sold to Thos. W. Ward for scrapping at their Barrow breaking yard.

References

Footnotes

Sources
 Colledge, J. J.; Warlow, Ben. (2002) Ships of the Royal Navy: The Complete Record of all Fighting Ships of the Royal Navy from the 15th Century to the Present 4th Edition. Casemate Publishers

External links

 

1942 ships
Ships built on the River Blyth
River-class frigates of the Royal Navy